Former LHS Telekommunikation GmbH & Co. KG, is now a fully integrated part of Ericsson. From 28 January 2011, the Ericsson brand is used for all billing and customer care solutions of the company.

History

LHS was founded in 1990 as LHS Specifications GmbH in Dreieich, Germany by Hartmut Lademacher, Dr. Joachim Hertel and Dr. Rainer Zimmermann, among other former IBM group managers, LHS is an acronym for Lademacher und Hertel Software.

In 1997, LHS Group Inc. floated on the Nasdaq stock exchange and later also on the Neuer Markt (Germany). LHS Group IPO was launched for $77 million.

Sema acquired LHS Inc. in 2000, by the amount of $4.7 billion, and subsequently, in 2001, Sema was taken over by Schlumberger by the amount of 5.2 billion, the resulting entity was then renamed SchlumbergerSema.

In 2003, Schlumberger withdrew from all sectors except its core sector of oilfield services and equipment. Its telecoms business was separated into a product house maintained by Schlumberger and a systems integration business, which was sold to Atos Origin for $1.5 billion.

In 2004, General Atlantic, LLC and LHS Acquisition GmbH, both amongst the original shareholders of LHS Group Inc., acquired the product house from Schlumberger.

LHS was converted to a stock corporation in August 2006 and went public in October 2006 on the German Prime Standard as LHS400.

In June 2007, Ericsson acquired the majority (75.1%) of LHS's shares, $420 million, and launched a public offer for the company.

Ericsson acquired the remaining company shares in February 2010. LHS was delisted from the German Stock Exchange and is now wholly owned by Ericsson.

Products and awards
LHS main product is BSCS (Business Support & Control System), an end-to-end rating, billing, interconnect and customer care system for telecommunication operators which is used widely till this day on a global level due to the large market share that it acquired during the early 2000s (more than 100 telecom operators) and their latest release under LHS was BSCS iX

LHS was awarded "Best Billing or Customer Care Solution" by the GSM Association (GSMA) in Cannes in 2005, received the Frost & Sullivan "Stratecast Global Investment of R&D Resources to Address Core Billing Needs" Award in 2007 and won the IIR World BSS Award for its "Overall Best Contribution to BSS" in London in 2005, 2006, and 2008. Furthermore, the company was awarded "Most Effective Customer Facing Project" in 2009 at the BSS Summit and the "Global Telecoms Business Innovation Award" in 2010.

External links
 Ericsson completes brand migration of LHS

Ericsson
Software companies of Germany
1997 initial public offerings
2000 mergers and acquisitions